McKenzie Grant (c. 1834 – 15 September 1897) was an Australian pastoralist and politician. He owned or leased large quantities of land in Western Australia, especially in the North-West, and served in the Legislative Council of Western Australia from 1880 to 1887 and again from 1889 to 1893.

Early life
Grant was born in Scotland to Margaret (née McKenzie) and George Grant. He arrived in Australia in 1852, during the Victorian gold rush, and initially worked on the goldfields at Bendigo. He then went to Queensland for a period before returning to Victoria and settling in Portland. In 1864, Grant was involved in the formation of the Portland Squatting Company, along with brothers Alexander and John Richardson and several others. The syndicate sought to exploit liberal land regulations in other colonies, and the following year its founders sailed to the North-West and established Pyramid Station. Grant remained in the Pilbara when the company was dissolved a few years later, and went into partnership with Charles Harper on the De Grey River. He also bought land in the nearby town of Roebourne.

Politics and later life
In March 1880, Grant was elected to the Legislative Council's Northern District, serving until April 1887. Having earlier purchased property in the Victoria Land District, he returned to parliament in January 1889 as the member for the seat of Geraldton. The Legislative Council was reconstituted in 1890 as the upper house of a new bicameral parliament, and Grant continued to serve as a nominee of the governor, William Robinson. He resigned his seat in July 1893, after falling ill, and died in Perth in September 1897. Grant had married Jane Hunter Eagar in 1875, with whom he had six sons and a daughter.

See also
 Members of the Western Australian Legislative Council

References

1830s births
1897 deaths
Australian pastoralists
Members of the Western Australian Legislative Council
Scottish emigrants to Australia
Settlers of Western Australia
19th-century Australian businesspeople
19th-century Australian politicians